Heimschuh is a municipality in the district of Leibnitz in the Austrian state of Styria.

Geography

Subdivisions
On 1 January 1968, the former municipality of Nestelberg was merged with Heimschuh.
Katastralgemeinden are Heimschuh, Kittenberg, Muggenau, Nestelberg bei Heimschuh, and Unterfahrenbach.

References

Cities and towns in Leibnitz District